Exoditis subfurcata is a moth in the family Xyloryctidae. It was described by Edward Meyrick in 1933. It is found on Madagascar.

References

Exoditis
Moths described in 1933